Plinia inflata, commonly known as  in Ecuador or  (Ecuadorian cambucá) in Brazil, is a species of plant in the family Myrtaceae. The tree is endemic to the Ecuadorian and Brazilian Amazon, grows to between 3 and 4 metres tall, and produces edible yellow-orange fruits. This plant has historically been mistaken for Eugenia subterminalis.

References

inflata
Crops originating from the Americas
Tropical fruit
Flora of South America
Fruits originating in South America
Cauliflory
Fruit trees
Berries